Cliff Richard is the seventh studio album by Cliff Richard, released by Columbia Records on LP in 1965 and available in both mono and stereo. It is Richard's thirteenth album overall. The album peaked at number 9 in the UK Albums Chart.

In some regions outside the UK, "Angel" was released as a single. It reached number 6 in Australia and number 14 in Belgium.

Track listing
"Angel"
"Sway" (with The Shadows)
"I Only Came to Say Goodbye" (with The Norrie Paramor Orchestra)
"Take Special Care" (with The Shadows, The Norrie Paramor Orchestra and The Mike Sammes Singers)
"Magic Is the Moonlight" (with The Shadows)
"House Without Windows" (with The Norrie Paramor Orchestra and The Mike Sammes Singers)
"Razzle Dazzle" (Charles Calhoun) (with The Shadows)
"I Don't Wanna Love you" (B. Mann - C. Weil)
"It's Not for Me to Say" (with The Norrie Paramor Orchestra and The Mike Sammes Singers)
"You Belong to My Heart" (with The Shadows)
"Again"
"Perfidia" (with The Shadows)
"Kiss" (with The Shadows, The Norrie Paramor Orchestra and The Mike Sammes Singers)
"Reelin' And Rockin'" (with The Shadows)

Personnel 
 Hank Marvin - lead guitar
 Bruce Welch - rhythm guitar
 Brian Bennett - drums
 Brian Locking - bass guitar 
 The Norrie Paramor Orchestra - strings
 The Mike Sammes Singers - backing vocals
 The Jordanaires - backing vocals (on "Again")

Releases 
The album was first released in April 1965.

The album was repackaged as a budget album in 1970 and re-titled All My Love. It added the track "All My Love (Solo Tu)" and dropped "Angel" and "Kiss".

References

External links
http://www.cliffrichard.org/biog/albums.cfm
http://www.discogs.com/Cliff-Richard-Cliff-Richard/master/759581

1965 albums
Cliff Richard albums
EMI Columbia Records albums
Albums produced by Norrie Paramor
Albums recorded at CBS 30th Street Studio